PNW may refer to:

 Pacific Northwest, a region including parts of the US and Canada
 The Northwestern United States, also sometimes called "Pacific Northwest"
 Pacific Northwest Wrestling
 Personal NetWare, Novell's peer-to-peer network solution for DOS since 1994
 Portable NetWare, Novell's network solution for Unix in the early 1990
 Purdue University Northwest, a branch campus of Purdue University in Indiana
 Panyjima language of Australia (ISO code: pnw)
 Penge West railway station, London, England (National Rail station code: PNW)